Santa Cruz Balanyá is a municipality in the Chimaltenango department of Guatemala.

Municipalities of the Chimaltenango Department